Depressaria dictamnella is a moth of the family Depressariidae. It is found in Germany, Austria, Italy, Hungary, Croatia, North Macedonia, Bulgaria, Romania, Moldova and Ukraine.

The wingspan is about 26 mm.

The larvae feed on the flowers and leaves of Dictamnus albus. They feed from a spinning.

References

External links
lepiforum.de

Moths described in 1922
Depressaria
Moths of Europe